The 2021 Fresno State Bulldogs football team represented California State University, Fresno as a member of the West Division of the Mountain West Conference (MW) during the 2021 NCAA Division I FBS football season. The Bulldogs were led by second-year head coach Kalen DeBoer during the regular season and Lee Marks as interim head coach for their bowl game. They compiled an overall record of 10–3 with a mark of 6–2 in conference play, plaching second in the MW's West Division. Fresno State was invited to the New Mexico Bowl, where they beat UTEP. The team played home games at Bulldog Stadium in Fresno, California.

Schedule

Rankings

Game summaries

UConn

No. 11 Oregon

Cal Poly

No. 13 UCLA

UNLV

Hawaii

Wyoming

Nevada

No. 21 San Diego State

Boise State

New Mexico

San Jose State

vs. UTEP (New Mexico Bowl)

References

Fresno State
Fresno State Bulldogs football seasons
New Mexico Bowl champion seasons
Fresno State Bulldogs football